Kim So-hee is a South Korean actress and model known for her roles in movies such as The Truth Beneath, and in dramas such as Sweet Revenge 2 and Solomon's Perjury.

Biography and career
Kim So-hee is a South Korean actress. She was born on January 10, 2000, in Daegu, South Korea. She made her first acting debut in the 2016 film The Truth Beneath and then in the same year, she also appeared in the television drama Solomon's Perjury as Kim Soo-hee.

Filmography

Film

References

External links 
 
 
 

2000 births
Living people
21st-century South Korean actresses
South Korean female models
South Korean television actresses
South Korean film actresses